Charles Knepper (February 18, 1871 in Anderson, Indiana – February 6, 1946 in Muncie, Indiana), was a Major League Baseball player, a right-handed pitcher who batted from the right side.

Knepper spent one season in the majors, pitching for the  Cleveland Spiders, a notoriously futile team that set a major league record by losing 134 games. Knepper was one of that team's primary starting pitchers, and he tied Jim Hughey for the team lead with four wins. He also ranked among the National League's leaders in several undesirable pitching categories, including home runs allowed (second, with 11), losses (fourth, with 22), earned runs allowed (seventh, with 141), and wild pitches (tenth, with eight).

Knepper was notoriously slow afoot. During a game on June 24, 1899, he hit a double, and the next day The Plain Dealer's game recap stated that "a hay wagon drawn by lame horses could have reached third, but Knepper is no hay wagon and had no lame horses to assist him".

External links

References

1871 births
1946 deaths
Major League Baseball pitchers
Baseball players from Indiana
Cleveland Spiders players
19th-century baseball players
Indianapolis Hoosiers (minor league) players
Burlington Colts players
Youngstown Puddlers players
St. Paul Saints (Western League) players
Washington Giants players